The 2018 season was the 11th season for the Indian Premier League franchise Kings XI Punjab.The team finished in 7th position and could not qualify for the playoffs.

Offseason

Support staff changes
 In December 2017, Brad Hodge was appointed head coach of the team
 In March 2018, Venkatesh Prasad, Nishanta Bordoloi and Shyamal Vallabhjee were appointed bowling coach, fielding coach and technical coach respectively

Others
In December 2017, the franchise requested to move its home from Mohali to an alternative city. The Board of Cricket Control in India rejected the request after some members of the IPL Governing Council opposed the idea.

On 13 March 2018, Kings XI Punjab unveiled their official jersey for the season while Kent RO Systems was announced as the chief sponsor of the team in a joint press conference.

On 16 March 2018, the Punjab Cricket Association requested that the BCCI reschedule some of Kings XI Punjab's home matches as Chandigarh Airport was likely to remain shut from 12 May to 31 May due to maintenance work. The team was supposed to play four home matches at the Punjab Cricket Association IS Bindra Stadium in Mohali from 4 May to 14 May, whereas the earlier home matches in April were scheduled to be held at Indore. On 20 March 2018, the franchise revealed their revised schedule, with Mohali hosting the first three home matches and Indore hosting the remaining four.

Squad 
 Players with international caps are listed in bold.

Administration and coaching staff

 Owners - Ness Wadia, Preity Zinta, Mohit Burman, Karan Paul
 Chief Executive Officer - Satish Menon
 Chief Operating Officer - Rajeev Khanna
 Team manager - Major Varoon Parmar
 Head of cricket operations and strategy - Virender Sehwag
 Head coach - Brad Hodge
 Assistant coach - Mithun Manhas
 Bowling coach - Venkatesh Prasad
 Fielding coach - Nishanta Bordoloi
 Strength & conditioning coach - Nishant Thakur
 Technical coach - Shayamal Vallabhjee
 Video analyst - Ashish Tuli
 Physiotherapist – Amit Tyagi

Season

League table

Results
All times are in Indian Standard Time (UTC+05:30)

References

External links

Punjab Kings seasons